Kamna Gorca is a small settlement west of Rogaška Slatina in eastern Slovenia. The entire area belongs to the traditional region of Styria. It is now included in the Savinja Statistical Region.

References

External links
Kamna Gorca on Geopedia

Populated places in the Municipality of Radovljica